HMS Telegraph was built in 1812 in New York as the American letter of marque Vengeance. The Royal Navy captured her in 1813 and took her into service as the 14-gun schooner or gunbrig Telegraph. Over a period of only about two years she took numerous small prizes and caused the destruction of a French 16-gun brig. A gale caused the wrecking of Telegraph in 1817.

Capture of Vengeance
On 1 January 1813, the 36-gun fifth-rate 18-pounder frigate  captured Vengeance. Vengeance was an American letter of marquee schooner of 180 tons and a 15-man crew that had been sailing from New York to Bordeaux with a cargo of cotton, coffee, sugar and indigo. Vengeance arrived in Plymouth on 8 January. She was closely followed by Hunter, Judathau Upton, master, an American privateer schooner that Phoebe had also captured. Hunter had been armed with 14 guns but she thrown 12 overboard during the chase. She had a crew of 73 men.

Prize taking

Lieutenant Timothy Scriven commissioned Telegraph at Plymouth. In British service Telegraph was armed with twelve 12-pounder carronades and had a crew of 60 men.

On 12 August 1813 she captured the American schooner Ellen & Emeline after a chase of 44 hours that brought the vessels to within 10 miles of Santander. Ellen & Emeline carried a cargo of silk for New York and was armed with a single 12-pounder gun on a pivot. She was only three hours out of Nantes when Telegraph first sighted her. Then on 23 August Telegraph detained and sent in the American schooner Allen & Adelaide, Booth, master, also from Nantes.

On 12 September Telegraph cut out of Bordeaux four small French vessels:
lugger Gustave, of 82 tons, from Bourdeaux, bound for Nantes;
chasse maree Unis Amis, of 54 tons, from Bourdeaux, bound to Nantes;
lugger Precieux, of 94 tons, from Bourdeaux, bound to Nantes; and
chasse maree Dunoire, of 68 tons, from Bourdeaux, bound to Brest. On 18 September Telegraph arrived at Falmouth with her four French prizes, laden with brandy, wine, and the like. She also destroyed the chasse maree Martha.

Ten days later she sailed with a convoy of transports for St. Sebastian.

Telegraph vs Flibustier

On 13 October 1813 Telegraph caused the destruction of the French 16-gun brig Flibustier (1810) in the mouth of the Adour. Flibustier had been in St Jean de Luz sheltering where shore batteries could protect her when she sought to escape because of the approach of Wellington's army. She started out during a "dark and stormy night", but Telegraph immediately pursued her. After an action lasting three-quarters of an hour, the French saw  and  coming up to join the engagement. Flibustiers crew set her on fire and escaped ashore. Lieutenant Scriven sent boats to try to save her, but they were unsuccessful and she blew up. Papers found on board showed lieutenant de vaisseau Jean-Jacques-Léonore Daniel had been the commander. She had been armed with sixteen French 24-pounder carronades, two 9-pounder guns, a brass howitzer, and four brass 3-pounder guns. There had been 160 men on board and Scriven reported that from what he saw, the French losses must have been considerable; Telegraph had no casualties. Lloyd's List reported that when Flibustier blew up there were still 30 wounded men aboard. The same report gave her armament as sixteen 32-pounder carronades, two long 9-pounder guns, and four brass 4-pounder guns.

Scriven believed that Flibustier was bound for Santona to relieve the garrison there as her cargo consisted of treasure, arms, ammunition, and salt provisions. He also thought that some of the men who had been aboard her were officers and soldiers for the garrison.

Both armies witnessed the British victory, with the allied army giving three cheers. As a reward for his success Scriven received a promotion to Commander and Telegraph was re-rated as a sloop of war.

Prize taking again
Telegraph took the French galiot Hercules, of 134 tons and five men, bound from Oleron to Nantes on 29 December. The next day she took the French chasse-marée Felicitee, of 60 tons and one man, bound from Bordeaux to Nantes. These may be the vessels described as the chasse-marée that on 4 January 1814 arrived in Plymouth, and the ketch that arrived in Falmouth, both prizes that Telegraph had taken.

On 27 February 1814 Telegraph captured the French chasse maree Clemence. Then on 10 March she captured the French dogger (or galliot) North Star from Île de Ré, of 80 tons and five men, also bound for Nantes. The next day  arrived in the Isles of Scilly towing a chasse-marée that Telegraph had taken. The North Star may have been the French galiot Neidsteerm that Telegraph had sent into Plymouth on 5 April.

Telegraph then sailed to the Halifax station. On 3 November Telegraph captured and destroyed the sloop Alert, of 25 tons and a crew of three. The next day Telegraph captured the sloop Four Brothers, of 20 tons and two men. That same day she destroyed the sloop John, of two men and 30 tons and the schooner Ann, of three men and 32 tons. Later that month Telegraph took the schooner Mary from Philadelphia for Havana and sent her to Bermuda. Telegraph had captured both on 25 November. Amy was of 84 tons and had a crew of eight. Mary was of 110 tons and had a crew of seven.

On 16 November 1814, Telegraphs and Spencers boats ran the famous American privateer Syren ashore under Cape May, where her crew destroyed her. Syren, a 7-gun schooner out of Baltimore and under the command of J.D. Daniels, had had a successful cruise in which she captured several prizes. One was Sir John Sherbooke. Another had taken place on 12 July 1814 when Syren captured the Royal Navy's 4-gun schooner  after a fight of 40 minutes with casualties on both sides.

The next month, on 11 December, Telegraph captured Rose.

At the end of December, on the 28th, Telegraph captured Trim, of four men and 40 tons. Then in the new year, on 12 January 1815, Telegraph captured Attempt of four men and 52 tons. Lastly, five days later, Telegraph captured the schooner William, of eight men and 105 tons, near Cape Hatteras.

In September 1815 Lieutenant Richard Crossman took command of Telegraph. In 1816 Lieutenant Jonathan Little replaced him. On 5 October, Telegraph seized the smuggling vessel Betsey and her cargo of spirits. The Collector of His Majesty's Excise, in Falmouth, also paid bounty-money for the three men who were on Betsey when Telegraph captured her.

Loss
During the night of 19–20 January 1817 Telegraph was anchored off the Eastern Hoe in Plymouth Sound. A gale came up that parted her cables and wrecked her on the point of Mount Batten, at the entrance of Catwater. Telegraphs only fatality was a seaman whom she crushed to death against her side. Several other men were injured. (Another report gives her losses as two dead out of her 50-man crew.) The court martial (on 28 January 1817), attributed the loss to short cables and insufficiently heavy anchors.

Post-script
On 31 December 1818 Parliament voted a grant to be distributed to all the vessels that had served under Admiral Lord Viscount Kieth in 1813 and 1814. Telegraph was among that number.

Notes, citations, and references
Notes

Citations

References
 

 

1812 ships
Schooners of the Royal Navy
Maritime incidents in 1817
Vengeance
Captured ships
Ships built in New York (state)